The Iran Nuclear Agreement Review Act of 2015 (INARA) (Pub.L 114–17) is a bill that was passed by the US Congress in May 2015, giving Congress the right to review any agreement reached in the P5+1 talks with Iran aiming to prevent Iran from obtaining nuclear weapons.

The bill passed in the Senate by a 98–1 vote (only Tom Cotton voted against), and then passed in the House by a vote of 400–25 on May 14. President Barack Obama threatened to veto the bill, but eventually a version arrived that had enough support to override any veto and Obama did not try vetoing it.

Larry Klayman filed a lawsuit, alleging that the law was an unconstitutional abrogation of the Senate's Treaty Power. The lawsuit was dismissed for lack of standing.

A group of Republican Senators said an agreement to return to the [Joint Comprehensive Plan of Action] (JCPOA) required congressional review under INARA, while others said the JCPOA has already been through such a review.

See also
 Joint Comprehensive Plan of Action, the final negotiated international agreement
 Iran Nuclear Achievements Protection Act, passed by Iranian Parliament
 Negotiations leading to the Joint Comprehensive Plan of Action

References

Acts of the 114th United States Congress
Iran–United States relations
2015 in international relations
United States foreign relations legislation
Nuclear program of Iran